The Panchpiria are a Muslim community found in the state of Uttar Pradesh in India.

Origin
The word panchpiria literally in Urdu means a follower of five pirs or Sufi holy men, from the Urdu word for five which is panch, and pir or holyman. This community gets its name from the fact that they are devotees of five sufi saints, Ghjazi Mian, Rajab Salar, Subhan Parihar and Bade Purukh. They are Muslim converts from the Bind caste. The Panchipiria are found mainly in the Doab region of western Uttar Pradesh.  Their customs are similar to the Lal Begi, another Muslim community that have been traditionally been involved in sweeping and scavenging.

Present circumstances
The Panchipiria are endogamous, and marry close kin. They speak both Urdu and the Khari boli dialect of Hindi. Their economic status is precarious, with many Panchpiria employed as street cleaners by many municipalities in western Uttar Pradesh. They are entirely landless, with many employed as wage labourers. The Panchpiria are also employed by the Shia community to play the shanai instruments during the Muharram festival. Like many other North Indian Muslim baradaris, they have a caste council that deals with inter community disputes as well as acting as an instrument of social control.

The Panchpiria are a unique syncrethic community, which incorporate many folk beliefs. This is seen by the fact that the five holy men they venerate are a mixture of Hindus and Muslims. For example, Ghazi Mian or as he is better known as, Syed Salar Masood, is a well known Sufi of North India and Bade Purukh was a Hindu Brahmin. They visit the shrine of Syed Salar Masood in Bahraich, and carry an emblem to the mausoleum. The Panchpiria practice all the major Hindu and Muslim festivals, as well as visiting Hindu temples. They are a community that occupy a transitional zone between Hinduism and Islam.

See also
Bind

References

Social groups of Uttar Pradesh
Muslim communities of Uttar Pradesh
Muslim communities of India
Dalit communities